Judah Aristobulus I or Aristobulus I was the first Hasmonean king of Judaea from 104 BCE until his death in 103 BCE. He was the eldest of the five sons of John Hyrcanus, the previous leader. Josephus states that he was the first Jew in "four hundred and eighty three years and three months" to have established a monarchy since the return from the Babylonian Captivity. Aristobulus was not only the first king from the Hasmonean lineage, but the first of any Hebrew king to claim both the high priesthood and kingship title. The Sadducees and the Essenes were not concerned about Aristobulus taking the title of king, but the Pharisees were infuriated; They felt that the kingship could only be held by the descendants of the Davidic line. The Pharisees began a massive rebellion, but Aristobulus died before any attempt to depose of him could occur.

The major historical sources of his life are Josephus's Wars of the Jews and Antiquities of the Jews. Aristobulus's reign is particularly noted for the Judaization of Galilee as well as the native Semitic people called Ituraeans. An account originally by Timagenes, Josephus quotes from Strabo's Historica Hypomnemata describing Aristobulus's regime as kindly and "very serviceable to the Jews" on account of the significantly expanded territory and the integration of "a portion of Ituraean nation whom he joined to them by the bond of circumcision".

Etymology 
Aristobulus is of Greek origin and is epithet meaning "best-advising". It has been used in the Intertestamental period of Palestine by ruling families. Aristobulus I was the first Hasmonean to have adopted the name, but his Hebrew name is Judah. He was also referred to as Philhellene, meaning he was an admirer of Greek culture. Josephus though does not elaborate as to why he was called this.

Early campaigns and monarchy established 
John Hyrcanus conquered much land during his efforts to expand Jewish territory, but throughout his campaign, Samaria resisted while surrounding land was captured. John so highly valued Samaria that he sent his two sons, Aristobulus and Antigonus, to capture it; they besieged the city. The residents requested aid from Antiochus IX Cyzicenus, who joined the battle but was defeated. Antiochus fled, and the brothers pursued him towards Scythopolis. After Antiochus eventually escaped, the brothers returned to Samaria, demolished the city, and enslaved its populace. The capture and destruction of Samaria occurred near the end of John Hyrcanus's long tenure. Forces led by the brothers then overran Scythopolis and the entire region south of Mount Carmel.

According to the directions of John Hyrcanus, the country after his death was to be placed in the hands of his wife, and Aristobulus was originally to receive the high priesthood only. Instead, Aristobulus became both king and high priest as he did not approve of his father's wishes; And to secure his kingship, he had his mother placed in prison where she starved to death; And to ensure himself of any possible endangerment from his family, he placed his three brothers in prison except for Antigonus whom he had friendly relations because they'd fought together against the enemies of Judaea.

Josephus does not name Hyrcanus's wife. He does state however that Aristobulus and Antigonus were the eldest of the five brothers, but  Aristobulus is the first born. The others were Alexander Jannaeus and Absalom. Josephus mentions a fifth brother but doesn't name him.

Conquest of Galilee 
Aristobulus had gone to war against the Ituraeans and taken territory from them. The conquered Ituraeans and the inhabitants had to accept Jewish law and be circumcised if they wanted to remain in their land. The Ituraeans were an Arab tribe that expanded their settlement from the Lebanese Beq'a to the Golan and Mount Hermon in the second century BCE after the collapse of the Seleucid Empire. They are first mentioned in Josephus's Antiquities 13.319 during Aristobulus I's conquest where Josephus writes, "he brought over to them a portion of the Ituraean nation".

Josephus's Antiquities 13.319 is a quote from Strabo's Historica Hypomnemata which was originally written by Timagenes stating "This man was a kindly person and very serviceable to the jews, for he acquired additional territory for them, and brought over to them a portion of the Ituraean nation, whom he joined to them by the bond of circumcision." This passage has been generally accepted as evidence for Josephus's reliance on Strabo and Timagenes's writings. It is unknown where the exact location of the confrontation took place and the territory which the Ituraeans occupied. Most scholars assume the Ituraean territory to be northern Galilee. There is also no evidence of forced Judaization on Galilee during Aristobulus's reign.

Death and successor

Feast of Tabernacles 
With sudden abdominal pains, Aristobulus's health gradually deteriorated, forcing him to return to his palace during the festival of Sukkot. His brother Antigonus would eventually return to Jerusalem to celebrate the festival at the Temple. Unfamiliar with ceremonial festivities, Antigonus arrived armed with escorting soldiers. According to Kenneth Atkinson, Antigonus had returned from a successful unspecified military campaign. He further states that Josephus didn't mention the location of the campaign. Atkinson presumes it to be Galilee since Antigonus had fine armour and military decorations procured in the region stated in Josephus's Jewish War 1.76.

In his morbid state, Aristobulus became prey to the factious influence of his wife Queen Salome Alexandra and conspirators; they had spread rumors about Antigonus attempting to seize the throne once he was seen in armour at the festival. Wearing military uniform was considered unorthodox during the occasion. Aristobulus became estranged of Antigonus once he heard of him parading at the temple courts in armour. Aristobulus was then informed by "evil men" that his brother was sending soldiers to murder him. Believing the report, Aristobulus barricaded himself at the fortified citadel Baris which was moated and had defensive towers.

Death of Antigonus and Aristobulus 
The queen, contemplating the possibility of being tortured and killed if Antigonus becomes king once Aristobulus is deceased from his worsening health, deliberately advised Antigonus to enter armed into an interview with his brother, though he had been summoned to answer suspicions of intrigue against his brother's life. The queen had bribed the messenger whom Aristobulus sent to his brother; the original message was altered by her. Instead of having Antigonus arrive to his brother's palace unarmed, she suggested that Antigonus should wear his new body-armour he had made in Galilee as a presentation upon Aristobulus's request. Incensed with suspicion at finding his brother armed, Aristobulus proceeded to have his brother killed. In frantic regret at this rash execution, Aristobulus's health drastically declined until his death shortly after. Queen Salome then released Aristobulus's brothers, selecting Alexander Jannaeus as the next king.

Coinage 
The first mint of Hasmonean coins didn't begin until the leadership of John Hyrcanus. Like his father, Judah Aristobulus only minted his coins with the title of the high priesthood. It wasn't until Alexander Jannaeus that both the roles of kingship and the high priesthood were minted onto coins. The majority of Judah's coins were found in the regions of Galilee and the Golan, primarily, the largest amount of coins were from Gamla. Archeologist found thirty coins at Gamla which is the largest amount to date. Majority of them come from his actual reign, while a small amount of these coins were minted after.

The numismatic evidence does not indicate Aristobulus assumed the title of king. There was also the possibility the coins could be attributed to Aristobulus II (67 – 63 BCE) who was also king and high priest, however, the longstanding debate began to favor more towards Aristobulus I when new numismatic evidence indicated that Aristobulus I had his coins minted with the name "Judah".

Because of his short reign of one year, only a small amount of coins are available that actually have the name "Judah". Ya'akov Meshorer categorized them into two groups. Twenty coins are inscribed with "Jehudah high priest and the assembly of the Jews", and another seven with the inscriptions of "Jehudah the high priest and the assembly of the Jews". Every coin has a value of one prutah and has the inscriptions in a wreath. On the opposite side, a cornucopia with pomegranates between them. The inscriptions on his coins are almost identical to that of the coins of his father and his brother Alexander Jannaeus.

Doubts of Josephus's statement that Aristobulus being the first Hasmonean monarch is indicated by his coins which do not contain the title of "king". Josephus's statement also conflicts with Starbo who states Alexander Jannaeus was the first king instead of the high priesthood, however, no Hasmonean relinquished the high priesthood in favor for the kingship. According to Kenneth Atkinson, Alexander Jannaeus received opposition for having the kingship title minted onto his coins. Alexander had many of those coins over-struck to replace the kingship title for the high priesthood. Atkinson considers the over-struck coins as evidence that the title of "king" was still problematic during Alexander's reign, which Atkinson concluded that “the absence of any royal designation of Aristobulus's coins does not indicate that he was never an actual monarch.”

Citations

Bibliography 
 
 

 

 

 

2nd-century BC births
103 BC deaths
2nd-century BC Hasmonean monarchs
2nd-century BCE High Priests of Israel